Aarika Hughes (born September 5, 1987) is an American basketball coach who is currently the head women's basketball coach at Loyola Marymount University.

Playing career 
Hughes played college basketball at USC from 2006 to 2010, and was a three-year captain.

USC statistics

Source

Coaching career 
Hughes began her collegiate coaching career at New Mexico State on her former college coach Mark Trakh's staff. While at New Mexico State, she was named to the Women's Basketball Coaches Association's "Thirty under 30" list. After five seasons at New Mexico State, she spent one season at New Mexico on the inaugural staff of Mike Bradbury.

USC 
Hughes joined the women's basketball staff at USC in 2017, working as an assistant under Trakh again.

Loyola Marymount 
Hughes was named the women's basketball head coach at Loyola Marymount on April 17, 2021.

Head coaching record

References

External links 
 
 Loyola Marymount Lions profile

1987 births
Living people
Sportspeople from Milwaukee
Sportspeople from Beaverton, Oregon
Basketball players from Milwaukee
Basketball players from Oregon
Basketball coaches from Wisconsin
Basketball coaches from Oregon
Shooting guards
Small forwards
USC Trojans women's basketball players
New Mexico State Aggies women's basketball coaches
New Mexico Lobos women's basketball coaches
USC Trojans women's basketball coaches
Loyola Marymount Lions women's basketball coaches
Southridge High School (Beaverton, Oregon) alumni
American women's basketball players
21st-century American women